Linda Joy Singleton (born October 29, 1957) is an American writer of speculative fiction, known for The Seer, Dead Girl, My Sister, the Ghost, Regeneration, Strange Encounters, and The Curious Cat Spy Club fiction series. Singleton wrote one novel in the young adult series Sweet Valley Twins as Jamie Suzanne.

Select Bibliography

Dead Girl
 Dead Girl Walking (2008)
 Dead Girl Dancing (2009)
 Dead Girl in Love (2009)

My Sister, the Ghost
 Twin Again (1995)
 Escape from Ghostland (1995)
 Teacher Trouble (1996)
 Babysitter Beware (1996)

Regeneration
 Regeneration (2000)
 The Search (2000)
 The Truth (2000)
 The Imposter (2000)
 The Killer (2001)

Strange Encounters
 Oh No! UFO! (2004)
 Shamrocked! (2005)
 Sea Switch (2005)

The Curious Cat Spy Club
 The Trail of the Ghost Bunny (2018)
The trail of the bunny bunny (2022)

Standalone Novels
 Love Potion (2002)
 Phantom Boyfriend (2002)
 Double Vision (2003)
 Mail Order Monster (2005)
 Melissa's Mission Impossible (2005)
 Memory Girl (2016)

References

External links

Living people
1957 births